Roberta Bruni (born 8 March 1994) is an Italian pole vaulter. She competed at the 2020 Summer Olympics, in Pole vault.

Career
Her personal best indoor (4.60 m) is the second best junior performance of all-time after the world record of the Swedish Angelica Bengtsson, established at the 2013 Italian Athletics Indoor Championships.

Her height of 4.35 m established on 16 June 2012 in Misano Adriatico was the third best by a junior athlete that year. She is a friend of fellow Italian pole vaulter Giorgia Benecchi.

National records
 Pole vault outdoor: 4.72 m (Rovereto, Italy, 30 August 2022) - Current holder
 Pole vault indoor: 4.62 m (Ancona, Italy, 18 February 2023) - Current holder

Progression

Pole vault outdoor
Updatet to 19 February 2023

Pole vault indoor

Achievements

National titles
Bruni has won eight national championships at individual senior level.

Italian Athletics Championships
Pole vault: 2014, 2018, 2022 (3)
Italian Athletics Indoor Championships
Pole vault: 2013, 2015, 2018, 2021, 2023 (5)

See also
 List of Italian records in athletics
 Italian all-time lists - Pole vault

References

External links
 

1994 births
Italian female pole vaulters
Living people
Athletes from Rome
Athletics competitors of Centro Sportivo Carabinieri
Universiade gold medalists in athletics (track and field)
Universiade gold medalists for Italy
Medalists at the 2019 Summer Universiade
Italian Athletics Championships winners
Athletes (track and field) at the 2020 Summer Olympics
Olympic athletes of Italy
20th-century Italian women
21st-century Italian women